Ivan Zvezdev (born 12 August 1975) is one of the top Bulgarian cuisine TV showmen.

Born in Pavlikeni, he has one older brother, Alex, as well as a sister, Boriana.
With the help of bTV, his cuisine show Bon Apeti is well known in Bulgaria. From the middle of 2006 it is also part of the television GTV.

He is married to Juliana, and has two kids - a son, Dimitar (or Mitko for short) and a daughter, Daniela (Dani).

References

Bulgarian television personalities
Living people
1975 births